Louisa Baïleche is a singer, dancer and performer in a variety of artistic genres. She was born near Paris to an Italian mother and a Kabyle father.

Louisa Baïleche has performed on the Comédie-Française stage as well as the Folies Bergère, in a French version of the musical Nine. She represented France in the Eurovision Song Contest 2003 with a song called "Monts et merveilles".

References

External links
Official myspace

1977 births
Living people
People from Île-de-France
French female dancers
French people of Italian descent
French people of Kabyle descent
Eurovision Song Contest entrants for France
Eurovision Song Contest entrants of 2003
Kabyle people
21st-century French singers
21st-century French women singers